The Ministry of Rail Transportation is the Myanmar government ministry that oversees railways in Myanmar.

List of heads
 Pan Aung
 Aung Min
 Zayar Aung
 Than Htay
 Nyan Tun Aung
 Thant Zin Mg

See also

 Rail transport in Myanmar
 History of rail transport in Myanmar
 Myanmar Railways
 Yangon Central Railway Station
 Yangon Circular Railway
 Yunnan-Burma Railway

References

External links
 

RailTransportation
Rail transport in Myanmar
Myanmar
Transport organisations based in Myanmar